Vasuki Koushik (born 19 September 1992) is an Indian cricketer. He made his Twenty20 debut for Karnataka in the 2018–19 Syed Mushtaq Ali Trophy on 24 February 2019. He made his List A debut on 8 October 2019, for Karnataka in the 2019–20 Vijay Hazare Trophy. Before his profession cricket debut, he was a mechanical engineer who once worked for Amazon, Koushik grew up playing cricket on the grounds of Bangalore. Until the age of 17, he was an offspinner but bowled medium pace in tennis-ball matches. He made his first-class debut on 9 December 2019, for Karnataka in the 2019–20 Ranji Trophy.

References

External links
 

1992 births
Living people
Indian cricketers
Place of birth missing (living people)
Karnataka cricketers